The Reed neighborhood of Portland, Oregon is in the southeast section of the city, just north of the campus of Reed College.
Tucker Maxon School is located in the Reed Neighborhood, and the Reed Neighborhood Association sometimes uses the school to hold meetings.

It was the site of Lambert Gardens, replaced by housing in 1968.

References

External links
 
 Southeast Uplift Neighborhood Program
Reed Street Tree Inventory Report

 
Neighborhoods in Portland, Oregon